Humphr(e)y Sibthorp may refer to:

 Humphry Sibthorp (botanist) (1713–1797), British botanist and educator
 Humphrey Sibthorp (1744–1815), English MP